The Land may refer to:

Film
 The Land (1969 film), 1969 Egyptian film
 The Land (1974 film), 1974 South Korean film
 The Land (2015 film), 2015 short documentary directed by Erin Davis about an adventure playground of the same name
 The Land (2016 film), coming-of-age film directed by Steven Caple Jr.

Literature
 The Land (Torres novel), a novel by Brazilian writer Antonio Torres published by Readers International.
 The Land (Taylor novel), a novel by Mildred D. Taylor
 Haaretz, Israeli newspaper whose name means "The Land" (as in the Land of Israel)
 The Land (newspaper), a rural newspaper in Australia owned by Fairfax Media
 The Land (magazine), a Minnesota farm and rural life newspaper owned by CNHI
 The Land, setting of Stephen R. Donaldson novels in The Chronicles of Thomas Covenant, the Unbeliever
 The Land, setting for Robert J. Sawyer novels in Quintaglio Ascension Trilogy
 The Land (poem), narrative poem by English poet Vita Sackville-West

Music
 The Land (song), British protest song

Place
 The Land (Epcot), pavilion at Walt Disney World's Epcot theme park
 The Land (adventure playground), junk playground located near Wrexham in north Wales, UK
 The Land, American venue of the Michigan Women's Music Festival

See also
 Land (disambiguation)